John Joseph Keane (November 3, 1911 – January 6, 1967) was an American professional baseball manager and coach. He managed in Major League Baseball (MLB) for four complete seasons and parts of two others. Keane is perhaps best remembered for his change of teams following the 1964 MLB season—after the St. Louis Cardinals defeated the New York Yankees in the World Series, he unexpectedly resigned as manager of the Cardinals and was subsequently hired to manage the Yankees.

Playing and managing career
Keane never played in the major leagues; beginning in 1930, he was a shortstop in the Cardinals' minor league system but suffered a head injury in 1935 after being hit by a pitch and lay in a coma for weeks. He began his managing career in 1938 in the Cardinals' organization, working his way from Class D (then the lowest rung on the ladder) to Triple-A, where he spent a decade as manager of top St. Louis farm clubs.

Keane finally reached the majors in 1959, when he was named the Cardinals' third-base coach. He replaced Solly Hemus as manager on July 6, 1961.

1964: Triumph amid turmoil
In August 1964, with Cardinals seemingly out of the race, team owner August "Gussie" Busch became convinced (possibly by Branch Rickey, whom he had hired as a consultant) that only a thorough housecleaning of Cardinal management would bring him the pennant he had craved since he bought the team in 1953. On August 17, he fired (or accepted the resignations of) almost every senior St. Louis front office executive. Keane was temporarily spared, but Busch was secretly negotiating with Leo Durocher (then a coach for the Los Angeles Dodgers) to become manager at the close of the 1964 season.

However, in the last two weeks of the season, the front-running Philadelphia Phillies — who had seemed a lock for the pennant — unexpectedly began to unravel while both the Cardinals and Cincinnati Reds got hot. The Phillies lost ten straight games, creating a four-team scramble for the National League pennant, involving the Phils, Cards, Reds and San Francisco Giants. Philadelphia came to St. Louis after losing seven straight at home and were swept by the Cardinals, who notched their eighth straight win and moved into first place at 92–67, with a three-game series at home with the lowly New York Mets (51–108) remaining. The Cardinals lost the first two, which dropped them into a tie with Cincinnati, one ahead of Philadelphia. On the final day of the regular season on Sunday, October 4, the Phillies blanked the Reds 10–0 and the Cardinals took the Mets 11–5 to avoid a three-way playoff and clinched their first NL pennant since 1946; they then defeated the New York Yankees in a seven-game World Series.

After winning the World Series on October 15, the Cardinals held a press conference the next day. Most expected that the team would formally announce a contract extension for Keane. Instead, Keane handed owner Busch and new general manager Bob Howsam (Bing Devine had been fired as GM on August 17) a surprise letter of resignation that he had written late in September, at the height of the pennant chase. The Cardinals then bypassed Durocher entirely and instead hired longtime fan favorite Red Schoendienst, a Hall of Fame second baseman and one of Keane's coaches, as the club's new manager.

Manager of 1965 Yankees
Shortly after his resignation, Keane became the surprise new manager of the Yankees on October 20, who reassigned first-year manager Yogi Berra on October 16, the day after the World Series. It was later revealed that the Yankees had made an informal inquiry about Keane's interest in the job during the 1964 season.

The Keane-Yankees pairing was not a good match; while the Yankees were coming off five straight American League pennants and 15 league championships in 18 years, the 1965 team was on a downhill slide. The circumstances of Keane's hiring caused a significant credibility gap with the players, and his aloof, distant manner did little to help.

When the 1966 version won only four of their first 20 games, Keane became the first Yankee manager to be fired in midseason since 1910. Prior to their game at California on Saturday, May 7, he was replaced by Ralph Houk, the team's general manager, who had managed the team from 1961 to 1963. The Yankees did not respond to Houk either and finished  in tenth (last) place, the first time in the cellar since 1912.

Managerial record

Post-managerial career
Keane is described in Jim Bouton's Ball Four as being prone to panic, and someone who was "willing to sacrifice a season to win a game" by putting injured stars into the lineup before their injuries had fully healed. Bouton tells a humorous anecdote of Keane pressuring Mickey Mantle to play on a bad leg. But in Keane's defense, Bouton also noted that general manager Houk and the team unfairly used Keane as the excuse for their losing records in 1965 and 1966, which were actually the result of an aging team with a depleted farm system.

Death
In December 1966, Keane accepted a scouting post with the California Angels. He suffered a fatal heart attack one month later at age 55 at his home in Houston, Texas. Keane had lived in Houston since his days as player and (later) manager for the Cardinals' longtime Texas League farm team, the Houston Buffaloes.

In Bouton's book, I Managed Good, But Boy Did They Play Bad, a collection of essays and stories about past Major League managers, he wrote that Keane seemed to be in awe of the Yankees, and that he underestimated the problems the team faced. Bouton felt that the immense pressure and stress of managing the Yankees through their inevitable collapse likely led to his death.

See also

 List of St. Louis Cardinals managers
 List of St. Louis Cardinals coaches

References

Further reading

External links

1911 births
1967 deaths
Albany Travelers players
Baseball players from Houston
Baseball players from St. Louis
Columbus Red Birds players
Elmira Red Wings players
Houston Buffaloes managers
Houston Buffaloes players
Major League Baseball third base coaches
Mobile Shippers players
New Iberia Cardinals players
New York Yankees managers
Rochester Red Wings managers
Rochester Red Wings players
St. Louis Cardinals coaches
St. Louis Cardinals managers
Springfield Cardinals players
Springfield Red Wings players
Waynesboro Red Birds players
World Series-winning managers